The 2017–18 season was 3rd consecutive season in the top Ukrainian football league and the last season for Stal Kamianske. Stal competed in Premier League and Ukrainian Cup. After finishing at 12th position Stal was relegated to First League at the end of the season. The team officially relocated to Bucha, Kyiv Oblast and renamed to Feniks in the 2018–19 midseason. However before the start of next season new club withdrew from 2018–19 Ukrainian First League due to financial difficulties.

Players

Squad information

Transfers

In

Out

Pre-season and friendlies

Competitions

Overall

Premier League

League table

Results summary

Results by round

Matches

Ukrainian Cup

Statistics

Appearances and goals

|-
! colspan=14 style=background:#dcdcdc; text-align:center| Goalkeepers

|-
! colspan=14 style=background:#dcdcdc; text-align:center| Defenders

|-
! colspan=14 style=background:#dcdcdc; text-align:center| Midfielders 

|-
! colspan=14 style=background:#dcdcdc; text-align:center| Forwards

|-
! colspan=14 style=background:#dcdcdc; text-align:center| Players transferred out during the season

Last updated: 19 May 2018

Goalscorers

Last updated: 19 May 2018

Clean sheets

Last updated: 19 May 2018

Disciplinary record

Last updated: 19 May 2018

Relocation of Stal from Kamianske to Bucha 
Following its first game at Obolon Arena in Kyiv, on 29 August 2017 FC Stal Kamianske ended up in the revived conflict which is ongoing since the end of 2015 when the new president of Stal became Vardan Israelian. The club's fan movement issued an ultimatum to the club's administration to relinquish their rights to the club's brand or the fans will have the Football Federation of Ukraine and the UEFA be involved in the issue. It should be reminded that the club's administration promised to have own home stadium Metalurh ready as early as the 2017–18 season.

Earlier on 20 August 2017, the club made an official press release were it stated that experiences financial difficulties and renting Meteor Stadium is more expensive than to play in Kyiv. It also mentioned that considering the fact that its senior team is currently training in Bucha city, it would make more sense to conduct the club's games at the Obolon Arena in Kyiv.

On 15 December 2017, it was published a copy of official letter from Stal administration petitioning to the Bucha's mayor in helping to relocate to his city. The letter is dated on 21 November 2017, and Stal insists on necessity to accomplish it all before the attestation for the next UPL season. The Bucha city authorities confirmed their interest in hosting the Premier League club which they can accommodate with a small stadium "Yuvileinyi" that has a capacity of 1,028 spectators.

On 20 February 2018 it was confirmed that Stal has relocated to Pushcha-Vodytsia in Kyiv and since the next season will represent the city of Bucha.

References

External links 
 Official website

Stal Kamianske
FC Stal Kamianske